Karel Černý (7 April 1922 – 5 September 2014) was a Czech art director and production designer. He won an Academy Award in the category Best Art Direction for the film Amadeus. He died aged 92 in 2014.

Selected filmography
 Black Peter (1964)
 Loves of a Blonde (1965)
 Amadeus (1984)

See also
 Cinema of the Czech Republic
 List of Czech Academy Award winners and nominees

References

External links

Czech art directors
Production designers
Czech set decorators
Best Art Direction Academy Award winners
Film people from Plzeň
1922 births
2014 deaths